Veinticinco de Mayo Department may refer to:

Argentina
Veinticinco de Mayo Department, Chaco
Veinticinco de Mayo Department, Misiones
Veinticinco de Mayo Department, Río Negro
Veinticinco de Mayo Department, San Juan

Department name disambiguation pages